The 2002 Eastbourne Borough Council election took place on 2 May 2002 to elect members of Eastbourne Borough Council in East Sussex, England. The whole council was up for election with boundary changes since the last election in 2000 reducing the number of seats by 3. The Liberal Democrats gained overall control of the council from the Conservative Party.

Background
Before the election the Conservatives controlled the council with 18 seats, compared to 12 for the Liberal Democrats. The whole council was elected after boundary changes reduced the number of wards from 10 to 9 and the number of councillors from 30 to 27.

Election result
The Liberal Democrats gained a majority of 3 on the council with 15 seats, compared to 12 for the Conservatives. Over a quarter of the Liberal Democrat councillors elected were new to the role, with the Liberal Democrat gains in Old Town and St Anthony's wards being reported as crucial to them taking control. Overall turnout at the election was 33.9%, up from 30.9% in 2000.

The Liberal Democrat success was put down to controversy over the Old Town library, issues such as anti-social behaviour and abandoned cars, and boundary changes.

Ward results

References

2002
2002 English local elections
2000s in East Sussex